Kim Chi Hun (born April 11, 1981), known professionally as Teo Yoo is a German-South Korean actor. He is known for his role as Viktor Tsoi in the musical film Leto.

Life 
Teo Yoo was born in Cologne, Germany. His father was a miner and his mother was a nurse. After graduating from high school in Germany, he went to the United States and England to study acting. 

In 2007, he married artist Nikki S. Lee.

Filmography

Film

Television series

Web series

Television shows

Discography

Singles

Awards and nominations

Listicles

References

External links
 

1981 births
Living people
South Korean male film actors
South Korean male television actors
Actors from Cologne
South Korean expatriates in Germany
Lee Strasberg Theatre and Film Institute alumni
Stella Adler Studio of Acting alumni
Alumni of RADA
South Korean male web series actors